The Mayor of Auckland City was the directly elected head of the Auckland City Council, the municipal government of Auckland City, New Zealand. The office existed from 1871 to 2010, when the Auckland City Council and mayoralty was abolished and replaced with the Auckland Council and the Mayor of Auckland.

History
This short-lived entity, which existed for about one year, had only one mayor, Archibald Clark.

Its municipal council was led by a chairman, Walter Lee. Soon afterwards the office of Mayor of Auckland was created. At first, the mayor was elected by the councillors. In 1875, Benjamin Tonks was the first mayor elected at large, i.e. by the ratepayers. There were 39 holders of the position. The longest-serving was Sir Dove-Myer Robinson, who held the post for 18 years, and was the first person to serve non-consecutive terms. There were two female Mayors; Catherine Tizard in 1983 and Christine Fletcher in 1998.

The city council was abolished on 31 October 2010. The area has since been governed by the Auckland Council, which also governs the rest of the Auckland Region.

List of mayors of Auckland City
Key

  

†: Died in office

List of deputy-mayors
Key

   

†: Died in office

References

Further reading

 
 
 

Auckland City
 Mayor of Auckland City
Auckland City Council